"The Sing-Song of Old Man Kangaroo" is a short story — one of the Just So stories by Rudyard Kipling.

The story was first told aloud by the author to his daughter Josephine as part of their oral tradition.  It was then written down and first published in Ladies' Home Journal in June 1900.

It involves a vain kangaroo who asks three gods to make him unlike other animals, and sought-after. Two of them, the Little God Nqa and the Middle God Nquing, refuse, and only the third, the Big God Nqong, accepts. The result is Yellow-Dog Dingo trying to catch Kangaroo all across Australia, explaining how kangaroos came to have strong legs.

Plot

References

19th-century British children's literature
Fictional kangaroos and wallabies
Animal tales
Short stories by Rudyard Kipling
Works originally published in Ladies' Home Journal
1902 short stories